Apolysis is a genus of bee flies in the family Bombyliidae. There are almost 120 described species in Apolysis.

See also
 List of Apolysis species

References

Further reading

 

Bombyliidae
Articles created by Qbugbot
Bombyliidae genera